

Lower Sorbian
The oldest Sorbian Bible version, that of the New Testament of 1547, is extant in a manuscript in the Royal Library at Berlin. The translator was Miklawš Jakubica, who employed a now-extinct dialect of Lower Sorbian. In the 18th century :de:Johann Gottlieb Fabricius (:dsb:Jan Bogumił Fabricius), a German, made a translation of the New Testament which was printed in 1709. In a revised form this version was published by the British and Foreign Bible Society in 1860. The Old Testament, translated by J. F. Fritz, was printed at Cottbus in 1796. An edition of the entire Bible was published by the Prussian Bible Society in 1868.

Upper Sorbian
Michał Frencel Pastor in Postwitz (Sorbian Budestecy)(d. 1706), translated the New Testament into the Upper Sorbian, and his version was published by his son, Abraham Frencel (Zittau, 1706). A complete edition of the Bible, the work of different scholars, was first published at Bautzen, 1728. A second revised edition was prepared by Johann Gottfried Kühn and issued in 1742; a third improved edition prepared by Johann Jacob Petschke was published in 1797. Passing over other editions, the ninth edition of the complete Bible (Bautzen, 1881) was revised by H. Immisch and others and also contains a history of the Upper Lusatian Wendish Bible translation. G. Lusanski and M. Hornik translated the New Testament from the Vulgate for the Roman Catholic Wends of Upper Lusatia and published it at Bautzen, 1887–92; the Psalms were translated from the Hebrew by J. Laras (Bautzen, 1872).

References

See also 
 Fabricius, Gottlieb. 1709. Das Neue Testament Unsers Herrn Jesu Christi

Sorbian
Sorbian languages